This is a list of Serbian regents, a regent, from the Latin regens "one who reigns", is a person selected to act as head of state (ruling or not) because the ruler is a minor, not present, or debilitated.

Middle Ages
Princess Milica, Regent of Serbia during the minority of Stefan Lazarević (1389)
Council of Regency during the Serbian Despotate: veliki vojvoda Mihailo Anđelović, prince Stefan Branković, and despotess Helena Palaiologina (fl. 1458)

Principality and Kingdom of Serbia
Council of Regency during the minority of Prince Milan (1868 to 1872): Milivoje Petrović Blaznavac, Jovan Ristić and Jovan Gavrilović
Council of Regency during the minority of King Aleksandar (1889 to 1893): Jovan Ristić, Jovan Belimarković and Kosta Protić (d. 1892)

Kingdom of Yugoslavia
Prince Alexander I of Yugoslavia (1888–1934), Regent of Yugoslavia (1914 to 1921)
Prince Paul of Yugoslavia (1893–1976), Regent of Yugoslavia during the minority of Peter II of Yugoslavia (1934 to 1941).

Serbian regents in other countries
Helena and Beloš Vukanović, Regents of Hungary (1141 to 1146)

See also
Regency
List of regents
List of Serbian monarchs
President of Serbia
Prime Minister of Serbia
Monarchy of Serbia

References

 
Serbia
Serbia
Heads of state of Serbia
Regents
Regents
Regents